Helkama Oy is a Finnish company and umbrella brand, operating several subsidiaries that focus on bicycles (Helkama Velox), cables for ships and communications (Helkama Bica), household appliances and refrigerators (Helkama Forste), accessories and imports for Škoda Auto automobiles (Helkama-Auto), and automobile maintenance and import (Uuttera Oy). Despite this broad variety of activities, Helkama is mostly known as a bicycle brand.

Helkama has also made several mopeds until they shut down the moped production in the 1990s. Helkama-mopeds were very popular in Finland. The most popular moped model was Helkama Raisu, 1970s and 1980s a trial bike which won several trial races.

Nowadays Helkama has also electric bicycles on its productlist.

External links 
 Official website
 Helkama Velox – Bicycles

Manufacturing companies based in Helsinki
Cycle manufacturers of Finland
Finnish brands